Ciuc Mountains (Romanian Munții Ciucului, Hungarian Csíki-havasok) are a mid-high range of mountains of Harghita County in Transylvania, Romania. Geologically they belong to the Căliman-Harghita Mountains group of the Inner Eastern Carpathians. Within Romania, however, it is traditional to divide the Eastern Carpathians (Carpații Orientali) into three geographical groups (north, center and south) instead. The Romanian categorization includes the Ciuc Mountains within the central Carpathians of Moldavia and Transylvania (Grupa Centrală, Carpaţii Moldo-Transilvani). The Trotuș River emerges from these mountains. The highest peak is Noșcolat, at 1,553 m.

See also

Divisions of the Carpathians

External links
 Additional information

Mountain ranges of Romania
Mountain ranges of the Eastern Carpathians
Geography of Harghita County